Supreme Ruler 2010 is a computer wargame in which a player controls all aspects of a region's government and attempts to unite a world of fragmented states in the year of 2010.

The game was produced by BattleGoat Studios and released by Strategy First in 2005.

Official support for Supreme Ruler 2010 ended in August 2006 with the release of the 6th update. The final version of the game was 4.6.1.

A sequel, Supreme Ruler 2020, was released in 2008 by publisher Paradox Interactive.

Reception

Supreme Ruler 2010 received "average" reviews according to the review aggregation website Metacritic.

Brett Todd of GameSpot praised the game's ease of play and quantity of scenarios but criticized the difficulty as being artificially inflated. Barry Brenesal of IGN gave praise to its gameplay and interfaces but criticized the AI and the numerous bugs.

References

External links
Supreme Ruler 2010 official website
SupremeWiki

2005 video games
Akella games
Alternate history video games
Black Bean Games games
Government simulation video games
Grand strategy video games
Multiplayer and single-player video games
Strategy First games
Supreme Ruler
Video games developed in Canada
Video games set in 2010
Windows games
Windows-only games